Natalia Lovece (born 30 March 1978) is an Argentine biathlete. She competed in two events at the 2002 Winter Olympics.

References

1978 births
Living people
Biathletes at the 2002 Winter Olympics
Argentine female biathletes
Olympic biathletes of Argentina
Place of birth missing (living people)